Harry R. Humphries (born November 17, 1940) is a former United States Navy SEAL who currently works as a consultant and actor on Hollywood films. After graduating from Admiral Farragut Academy and attending Rutgers University in New Jersey, Humphries joined the Navy, where he was assigned to UDT 22 and SEAL Team 2.  In 1971, Humphries left the Navy with an Honorable Discharge. After a career with Henkel KGaA, the German Multi National Chemical Company, he moved to California, where he started Global Study Group, Inc. ("GSGI").  Humphries currently resides in Huntington Beach, California where he works full-time as a Security Consultant and Entertainment Technical Adviser/Actor.

Military career
Soon after joining the Navy, Humphries completed UDTR (Underwater Demolition Team Replacement) Class 29 and graduated as Honor man. This was before BUD/S was created.  After working with UDT 22 for some time in 1965 to 1967, Humphries volunteered for and was accepted into SEAL Team Two alongside Richard Marcinko, who would later in life go on to write The New York Times best selling book Rogue Warrior, an autobiographical account of his life in the Navy (Humphries is mentioned numerous times throughout the book). Humphries was involved in over 200 combat missions and served two tours in Vietnam, first as a member of Eight Platoon, SEAL Team TWO under Lt Marcinko, and then later as a "PRU Advisor" with Phoenix Program's Counter-Terrorism unit.  It was during this second tour of duty when he was severely wounded.  One of Humphries' most famous operations was during the Tet Offensive when he and other SEALs drove into Chau Doc to rescue medical personnel trapped in a crossfire. It was for this action that Humphries was awarded a Bronze Star. In 1969, after being promoted to petty officer first class, Harry Humphries left the Navy.

GSGI (Global Study Group Inc.)

Tactical
While GSGI mostly works within the film industry, they formerly offered tactical training to police and military units. Humphries was a tactical instructor with the Advanced HRT (Hostage Rescue Team) Instructors program at Eastern Michigan University and at Gunsite Training Center near Paulden, Arizona.  He participated in the Illinois University Police Training Institute Master Instructor program.  He still does some training for Law Enforcement, Military and qualified civilians.

Consulting
With GSGI, Humphries has  focused on consulting for Hollywood movies. Humphries acts as tactical consultant/advisor, technical advisor, script consultant, military advisor, stuntman and producer.  Humphries has worked with numerous directors on many different movies.  He has done several movies with Michael Bay, Tony Scott, Antoine Fuqua and Ridley Scott.  He also worked with other well-known directors such as John Woo and Brian De Palma.  He has an extensive resume of consulting credits.

Prime Directive: Directed by Michael Bay – Tactical Consultant
Déjà Vu: Directed by Tony Scott – Tactical Consultant
Domino: Directed by Tony Scott – Tactical Consultant
The Island: Directed by Michael Bay – Tactical Advisor
XXX: State of the Union: Directed by Lee Tamahori – Technical Advisor
National Treasure: Directed by John Turtletaub – Script Development
Sahara: Directed by Breck Eisner – Supervising Technical Advisor
King Arthur: Directed by Antoine Fuqua – Military Advisor
Bad Boys 2: Directed by Michael Bay – Supervising Technical Advisor
Tears of the Sun: Directed by Antoine Fuqua – Supervising Military Advisor
Black Hawk Down: Directed by Ridley Scott – Associate Producer / Military Department Head
Pearl Harbor: Directed by Michael Bay – Technical Advisor
Gone in 60 Seconds: Directed by Dominic Sena – Technical Advisor
Mission: Impossible 2: Directed by John Woo – Script / Technical Consultant
Enemy of the State: Directed by Tony Scott – Technical Advisor
Armageddon: Directed by Michael Bay – Technical Advisor
Snake Eyes: Directed by Brian De Palma – Technical Advisor / Script Consultant
The Peacemaker: Directed by Mimi Leder – Technical Advisor / Script Development
Con Air: Directed by Simon West – Technical Advisor / Stunt Work
GI Jane: Directed by Ridley Scott – Technical Advisor / Script Consultant
The Rock: Directed by Michael Bay – Technical Advisor / Script Development
Soldier of Fortune, Inc.- Technical Advisor

Actor
In addition to consulting and advising, Humphries occasionally works as an actor.  He has been given small, but memorable, roles in a few of the movies for which he consulted.

GI Jane: Directed by Ridley Scott – played the role of "Warrant Officer Fenton – SEAL Instructor"
Armageddon: Directed by Michael Bay – played the role of "Chuck Jr – Senior NASA Astronaut Instructor"
The Rock: Directed by Michael Bay – played the role of "Admiral Williams – Commander Naval Special Warfare"

ISS (International Security Solutions LLC)
While most of his work is with GSGI, Humphries also owns and operates ISS, a security consulting firm specializing in government contracts related to domestic counter-terrorism preparedness with a focus on Weapons of Mass Destruction (WMD's).

Qualifications/capabilities
Humphries is a graduate of various tactical/military/law enforcement programs in several states and countries. A former Navy SEAL, he also earned these qualifications:

 Military and Police Special Operations – Humphries has a working relationship with the Criminal Justice and Special Forces communities, and
 Engineer – As an engineer he has operational and consulting experience in various countries, including Russia, CIS States, Albania, Kosovo, the Middle East, Latin America and of course the U.S.

He also owns an extensive collection of Desperate Dan comics, thought to be valued at $1.5 million.

References

External links

1940 births
Living people
American consultants
21st-century American engineers
American film producers
American stunt performers
United States Navy sailors
United States Navy SEALs personnel
United States Navy personnel of the Vietnam War
Engineers from New Jersey